The Department of Community, Culture and Leisure (often abbreviated to DCCL) was one of nine departments of the Isle of Man Government. It was created on 1 April 2010 taking over the leisure functions from the former Department of Tourism and Leisure along with the community and culture functions from various other departments. It was dissolved on 1 April 2014.

Functions

Community
 Public transport
 Bus Vannin
 Isle of Man Railway
 Manx Electric Railway
 Recreational clubs

Culture
 Manx culture
 Arts
 Management of the Villa Marina complex

Leisure
 Leisure
 Sports
 Management of the National Sports Centre (NSC)
 Curraghs Wildlife Park

Non Governmental agencies reporting to the DCCL
 Arts Council
 Manx National Heritage
 Manx Heritage Foundation
 Office of Fair Trading
 Sports Council
 Swimming Pool Authorities

Ministers for Community, Culture and Leisure
 David Cretney MHK, 2010–11
 Tim Crookall MHK, 2011–2012
 Graham Cregeen MHK, 2012-2014
 Chris Robertshaw MHK, 2014

External links

Government of the Isle of Man
Ministries established in 2010
Culture ministries
Cultural organisations based in the Isle of Man